Leading Creek is a tributary of the Tygart Valley River,  long, in eastern West Virginia in the United States. The stream's entire course and drainage basin are in northern Randolph County.

Leading Creek rises north of Montrose and flows southward in a valley between Laurel Mountain and Cheat Mountain, through Montrose and the unincorporated community of Kerens, to Elkins, where it flows into the Tygart Valley River from the north.  The creek is paralleled by U.S. Route 219 for most of its course.

According to the West Virginia Department of Environmental Protection, approximately 80 percent of the Leading Creek watershed is forested, mostly deciduous.  Approximately 18 percent is used for pasture and agriculture.

See also
List of rivers of West Virginia

References 

Rivers of West Virginia
Rivers of Randolph County, West Virginia